Sangyuan is a town in Huailai County, in Hebei province, China. , it has 31 villages under its administration. In 2019 it had a population of 25,658.

References

Township-level divisions of Hebei
Huailai County